Riverside 98.2 FM is a South African community radio station based in the Northern Cape.

Coverage Areas & Frequencies 
Upington
Karos
Keimoes
Morning Glory
Nisikilelo
Currieskamp

Broadcast Languages
English
Afrikaans
Xhosa
Setswana

Broadcast Time
06h00 – 24h00

Target Audience
LSM Groups 1 – 7

Programme Format
40% Music
60% Talk

Listenership Figures

References

External links
SAARF Website
Sentech Website

Community radio stations in South Africa
Mass media in the Northern Cape